Md. Akkash Ali Sarker (known as Akkas Ali) is a Bangladeshi politician and a former Jatiya Sangsad member representing the Kurigram-3 constituency winning the by-election held in July 2018 after the death of AKM Maidul Islam.

References

Living people
Jatiya Party politicians
10th Jatiya Sangsad members
1984 births
Place of birth missing (living people)